Maicon de Andrade Siqueira (born 9 January 1993) is a taekwondo competitor from Brazil. He won bronze medals in both the 2015 Summer Universiade and the 2016 Summer Olympics, being the first Brazilian man to get an Olympic medal in that sport - and second overall after Natália Falavigna.

References

1993 births
Living people
Olympic taekwondo practitioners of Brazil
Sportspeople from Minas Gerais
Brazilian male taekwondo practitioners
Taekwondo practitioners at the 2016 Summer Olympics
Olympic bronze medalists for Brazil
Olympic medalists in taekwondo
Medalists at the 2016 Summer Olympics
People from Minas Gerais
Universiade medalists in taekwondo
Universiade silver medalists for Brazil
Universiade bronze medalists for Brazil
Pan American Games medalists in taekwondo
Pan American Games bronze medalists for Brazil
Taekwondo practitioners at the 2019 Pan American Games
Medalists at the 2015 Summer Universiade
Medalists at the 2017 Summer Universiade
Medalists at the 2019 Pan American Games
21st-century Brazilian people